The 1970–71 UC Irvine Anteaters men's basketball team represented the University of California, Irvine during the 1970–71 NCAA College Division men's basketball season. The Anteaters were led by second year head coach Tim Tift and played their home games at Crawford Hall. The anteaters finished the season with a record 16–10.

Previous season
After previous head coach Dick Davis accepted the head coaching position at San Diego State, frosh coach Tim Tift was hired to be his replacement. The anteaters finished the season with a record 17–9 and were not invited to a post season tournament.

Roster

Schedule

|-
!colspan=9 style=|Regular Season

Source

References

UC Irvine Anteaters men's basketball seasons
UC Irvine Anteaters
UC Irvine Anteaters